Pseuduvaria mulgraveana is a species of plant in the family Annonaceae. It is native to Australia. L.W. Jessup, the botanist who first formally described the species, named it after the Mulgrave River in Goldsborough, Queensland where the specimen he examined was collected.

Description
It is a small tree reaching 5 meters in height. The young, light yellow to dark brown branches are densely hairy but become hairless as the branches mature. The branches also have sparse lenticels. Its elliptical, membranous to papery leaves are 9-17 by 4-8.5 centimeters. The leaves have rounded to flat bases and tapering tips, with the tapering portion 5-18 millimeters long. The leaves are hairless on their upper surfaces and slightly hairy on their lower surfaces. The leaves have 8-12 pairs of secondary veins emanating from their midribs. Its densely hairy petioles are 2-5 by 0.8-2.5 millimeters with a broad groove on their upper side. Its solitary Inflorescences occur on branches, and are organized on indistinct peduncles. Each inflorescence has a solitary flower. Each flower is on a sparsely to very densely hairy pedicel that is 20-45 by 0.3-0.8 millimeters. The pedicels are organized on a rachis up to 5 millimeters long that have 2 bracts. The pedicels have a medial, very densely hairy bract that is 0.7-1.2 millimeters long. Its flowers are male or hermaphroditic. Its flowers have 3 triangular sepals, that are 1.5-3 by 1-2 millimeters. The sepals are hairless on their upper surface, sparsely to densely hairy on their lower surface, and hairy at their margins. Its 6 petals are arranged in two rows of 3. The white to light purple, egg-shaped, outer petals are 4.5-8.5 by 4.5-7 millimeters with hairless upper and sparsely hairy lower surfaces. The white to light purple, diamond-shaped inner petals have a 1.5-5 millimeter long claw at their base and a 6.5-15 by 6-10.5 millimeter blade. The inner petals have flat to pointed bases and pointed to sharply pointed tips. The inner petals are hairless on their upper surfaces, except at the margins near the tip, and sparsely to densely hairy on their lower surfaces. The inner petals have two, elliptical, smooth, prominently raised glands on their upper surface. Male flowers have 105-115 stamens that are 0.8-1 by 1-2.2 millimeters. Hermaphroditic flowers have 28-30 carpels that are 1-2.2 by 0.5-0.7 millimeters.  Each carpel has 2 ovules arranged in a row. The hermaphroditic flowers also have up to 10 stamens. The fruit occur in clusters of up to 10 on slightly hairy pedicles that are 32-45 by 1-2 millimeters. The orange, oval to globe-shaped fruit are 10-13 by 6-13 millimeters. The fruit are smooth, and very densely hairy. Each fruit has up to 2 spherical seeds that are 8-9.5 by 8.5-10 by 5.5-7.5 millimeters. The seeds are wrinkly.

Reproductive biology
The pollen of P. mulgraveana is shed as permanent tetrads. Aethina australis beetles have been observed in the field serving as pollinators. P. mulgraveana has both male and hermaphroditic flowers, but the anthers in the latter only mature after the petals have fallen and the pollinators have left, rendering them effectively monoicous.

Habitat and distribution
It has been observed growing in mixed soils in vine forests at elevations of 60-80 meters.

Uses
Oils extracted from its leaves contain high levels of elemicin.

References

mulgraveana
Flora of Queensland
Endemic flora of Australia 
Plants described in 1987